Capercaillie may refer to:
Capercaillie, birds in the genus Tetrao
Western Capercaillie, often known just as "capercaillie"
Capercaillie (band), the Scottish folk band
Capercaillie, an album by the Scottish folk group